Orinoco Department was one of the departments of Gran Colombia created in 1824. Its territory was split from the Venezuela Department.

It had borders to 
 Apure Department in the West.
 Boyacá Department in the West.

Provinces 
 Cumaná Province. Capital: Cumaná. Cantons: Cumaná, Carupano, Cumanacoa, Maturín, Cariaco, Aragua Cumanés and Río Caribes.
 Guayana Province. Capital: Angostura. Cantons: Angostura, Barceloneta, Alto Orinoco (capital Caicara), Caroni, Guayana Vieja, Caura (capital cabecera Moitaco), La Pastora and Upata.
 Barcelona Province. Capital: Barcelona. Cantons: Barcelona, Aragua, Pilar, Piritu, San Diego and Villa del Pao.
 Margarita Province. Capital: Asunción. Cantons: Asunción and Norte (capital Santa Ana del Norte).

Departments of Gran Colombia
1824 establishments in Gran Colombia